Federal headship refers to the representation of a group united under a federation or covenant. For example, a country's president may be seen as the federal head of their nation, representing and speaking on its behalf before the rest of the world. Related to the created order, the concept of headship is taught in Christian theology, with respect to God, Jesus, man and woman. It has historically been externally reflected through the Christian practice of headcovering.

In Christianity

In Christianity, this concept has been used to explain the concepts of the covenants found in the Bible.  In particular, it has been applied to passages such as Romans 5:12-21, explaining the relation of all humanity with Adam, as well as the relation of redeemed humanity with Jesus Christ, who is called the last Adam. According to this understanding, as humanity's federal head Adam brought the entire human race into sin, misery, and death due to his disobedience.  Christ, in his perfect obedience to God the Father, earned eternal life and blessedness for all his people.

New Testament scholar Ben Witherington III explicates the historical interpretation of this passage:

In Conservative Anabaptist Christianity, the woman's headcovering is worn throughout the day "to show that the wearer is in God's order." The concept of headship can be found in the writings of the Church Fathers, including Irenaeus' Against Heresies and Augustine's City of God. The full theological articulation came in the time of the Protestant Reformation, and this doctrine is held by many Protestant churches, particularly in conservative Reformed and Presbyterian churches, as well as those of Conservative Anabaptism.

See also
Covenant Theology
Calvinism
Imputed Righteousness

References

Further reading

External links 
Headship and Head Covering by Rev. Chalan Hetherington - Bennetts End Reformed Baptist Church
The Significance of the Christian Woman's Veiling by Merle Ruth - Anabaptists 
Why We Wear a Headship Covering by Brenda M. Weaver - Wilkes-Barre Mennonite Church
The Practice of Headcoverings in the New Testament Church by Rev. William O. Einwechter - Immanuel Free Reformed Church

Christian theology and politics
Calvinist theology
Religious concepts related with Adam and Eve
First Epistle to the Corinthians
Christianity and women